Ganiefendi Çiftliği is a village in the Erzincan District, Erzincan Province, Turkey. The village is populated by Kurds of the Kurmeş tribe and had a population of 270 in 2021.

References 

Villages in Erzincan District
Kurdish settlements in Erzincan Province